Byrtevatn is a lake in Tokke Municipality in Vestfold og Telemark county, Norway. The main natural influx comes from the river Byrteåi. Byrtevatn has a dam on the south end of the lake which regulates the surface elevation of the lake. Water from the nearby lake Botnedalsvatn flows through a tunnel into the Byrte Hydroelectric Power Station and the water is then released into this lake.

See also
List of lakes in Norway

References

Tokke
Lakes of Vestfold og Telemark